Johnstone Strait is a  channel along the north east coast of Vancouver Island in British Columbia, Canada.  Opposite the Vancouver Island coast, running north to south, are Hanson Island, West Cracroft Island, the mainland British Columbia Coast, Hardwicke Island, West Thurlow Island and East Thurlow Island.  At that point, the strait meets Discovery Passage which connects to Georgia Strait.

Name origin
The Strait was named by Vancouver for James Johnstone, master of the armed tender Chatham.  In 1792, his survey party established that Vancouver Island was an island.

Geography
It is a major navigation channel on the west coast of North America. It is the preferred channel for vessels from the Strait of Georgia  leaving to the north of Vancouver Island through the Queen Charlotte Strait bound for Prince Rupert, Haida Gwaii, Alaska, and the North Pacific Ocean, and for southbound vessels from those areas bound for the ports of Vancouver, Seattle and Tacoma.

There are no cities or towns along the length of the strait. Telegraph Cove and Robson Bight on Vancouver Island are along the strait near its north end and the village of Sayward on Kelsey Bay is near its midpoint.

Ecology

During the summer months, the Strait is home to approximately 150 orcas, which are often seen by kayakers and boaters packed with tourists.

Scientists including Michael Bigg and Paul Spong have been researching the orcas in the Strait since 1970. Spong established the OrcaLab, based on studying the Orcas in their natural habitat without interfering with their lives or their habitat. The strait includes the Robson Bight (Michael Bigg) Ecological Reserve.

See also
 Cordero Channel

References

External links
 Orcas of Johnstone Strait
 

Landforms of the Discovery Islands
Straits of British Columbia
Bodies of water of Vancouver Island
Central Coast of British Columbia